Abortion in Iowa is legal. In 2014, a poll by the Pew Research Center found that 52% of Iowa adults said that abortion should be legal vs. 46% that believe it should be illegal in all or most cases. By 2012, state legislators introduced bills to ban abortion in almost all cases on a yearly basis. 

The number of abortion clinics in Iowa has fluctuated over the years. There were 25 in 1982, 11 in 1992, 12 in 2014, and 8 in 2017. There were 3,760 legal abortions in Iowa in 2017. A #StoptheBans protest occurred at the Statehouse in Des Moines on May 21, 2019.

In 2017, Iowa rejected millions of dollars in federal funding for Medicaid as part of their efforts to try to defund Planned Parenthood and its abortion services in the state. In 2020, it was reported that abortions in Iowa went up for the first time in decades—25 percent—with the loss of that federal aid attributed to the increase.

In 2018, Planned Parenthood of the Heartland, Inc., Jill Meadows, M.D., and Emma Goldman Clinic (petitioners) filed a lawsuit seeking declaratory and injunctive relief in state court, arguing the early abortion ban violated the Iowa State Constitution. Courts supported their injunction request, saying the law violated the state's constitution.

In February 2020, the State Senate passed a constitutional amendment clarifying that there is no right to an abortion in the Iowa constitution. The amendment must now pass the House, the legislature again in 2022, and a statewide vote before it becomes law.

History

Legislative history 

By the end of the 1800s, all states in the Union except Louisiana had therapeutic exceptions in their legislative bans on abortions. In the 19th century, bans by state legislatures on abortion were partly about protecting the life of the mother given the number of deaths caused by abortions; state governments saw themselves as looking out for the lives of their citizens. Bans were also seen as protecting the life of the fetus or embryo, with abortion often being equated with infanticide.

In 2012, Iowa was one of three states where the legislature introduced a bill that would have banned abortion in almost all cases. It did not pass. The legislature tried and failed again in 2013, 2014, 2015, 2016, 2017 and 2018, where they were one of five states, one of three states, one of five states, one of four states, one of eleven states, and one of eleven states respectively trying to ban abortion.

In 2017 in Iowa, the Republican-controlled state legislature passed a bill that rejected millions of dollars in federal funding for Medicaid as part of their efforts to try to defund Planned Parenthood and its abortion services in the state. The state legislature was one of ten states nationwide that tried to unsuccessfully pass an early abortion ban in 2018. Only Iowa successfully passed such a bill, but it was struck down by the courts. The legislature had successfully passed a law moving the state's abortion ban to 6 weeks sometime between 2018 and 2019. This was struck down by the courts as too extreme. As of mid-April 2019, state law banned abortion after week 22. On May 4, 2018, governor Kim Reynolds signed into law a bill that would ban abortion in Iowa after embryonic cardiac activity is detected, starting July 1, 2018. On January 22, 2019, a county district judge declared the law to be in violation of Iowa's State Constitution and entered a permanent injunction prohibiting its enforcement. In 2019, women in Iowa were eligible for pregnancy accommodation and pregnancy-related disability as a result of legal abortion or miscarriage. Employers were required to offer up to eight weeks of unpaid leave if a woman did not have sufficient leave available.

Judicial history 
The US Supreme Court's decision in 1973's Roe v. Wade ruling meant the state could no longer regulate abortion in the first trimester.

On May 15, 2018, eleven days after Iowa Governor Kim Reynolds signed SF 359 into law, Planned Parenthood of the Heartland, Inc., Jill Meadows, M.D., and Emma Goldman Clinic (petitioners) filed a lawsuit seeking declaratory and injunctive relief in state court arguing the early abortion ban violated the Iowa State Constitution. On June 1, 2018, Polk County District Court Judge Michael Huppert entered a preliminary injunction which temporarily blocked the law from going into effect. On January 22, 2019, the county district judge declared the law to be in violation of the Iowa Constitution and entered a permanent injunction prohibiting its enforcement. In holding the law unconstitutional the judge cited the Iowa Supreme Court's 2018 ruling in a challenge to a different abortion restriction in which the state's court of last resort held that "a woman's right to decide whether to terminate a pregnancy is a fundamental right under the Iowa Constitution." Anti-abortion proponents said they hoped this litigation created a pathway for Roe v. Wade to be reexamined by the U.S. Supreme Court, but University of Iowa law professor Paul Gowder and other legal experts said that it was almost impossible that it could end up in front of the U.S. Supreme Court, as the U.S. Supreme Court does not review Supreme Court decisions concerning state constitutional questions.

Anti-abortion legislators have filed legislation to amend the state constitution to state, "that the Constitution of the State of Iowa does not secure or protect a right to or require the funding of abortion." The resolutions proposing to amend Iowa's constitutions are SJR 9 and HJR 5 which were filed on January 24, 2019, and February 6, 2019, respectively.

On June 17, 2022, the Iowa Supreme Court ruled that the state constitution does not protect the right to an abortion. Justice Edward Mansfield wrote in the majority that "All we hold today is that the Iowa Constitution is not the source of a fundamental right to an abortion necessitating a strict scrutiny standard of review for regulations affecting that right". The court's decision is a reversal of its 2018 ruling, where it found that the constitution protects the right to an abortion.

The Supreme Court overturned Roe v. Wade in Dobbs v. Jackson Women's Health Organization,  later in 2022.

Clinic history 

Between 1982 and 1992, the number of abortion clinics in the state decreased by fourteen, going from 25 in 1982 to eleven in 1992. In 2014, there were twelve abortion clinics in the state. In 2014, 89% of the counties in the state did not have an abortion clinic. That year, 42% of women in the state aged 15–44 lived in a county without an abortion clinic. In March 2016, there were 13 Planned Parenthood clinics in the state. In 2017, there were eight Planned Parenthood clinics in a state with a population of 680,659 women aged 15–49 of which five offered abortion services.

Governor's 2020 Coronavirus emergency declaration 
On March 26, 2020, Governor Kim Reynolds expanded upon previous COVID-19 disaster proclamations to halt elective and non-essential surgeries. The following day her office asserted: "[The] Proclamation suspends all nonessential or elective surgeries and procedures until April 16th, that includes surgical abortion procedures".

Statistics 
In the period between 1972 and 1974, there were no recorded illegal abortion deaths in the state. In 1990, 302,000 women in the state faced the risk of an unintended pregnancy. In 2001, Arizona, Florida, Iowa, Louisiana, Massachusetts, and Wisconsin did not provide any residence related data regarding abortions performed in the state to the Centers for Disease Control.

In 2017, the state had an infant mortality rate of 5.3 deaths per 1,000 live births. In 2010, the state had 23 publicly funded abortions, of which were three federally and twenty were state funded. In 2013, among white women aged 15–19, there were 380 abortions, 60 abortions for black women aged 15–19, 0 abortions for Hispanic women aged 15–19, and 60 abortions for women of all other races.

Public Opinion 
In 2014, 52% of adults said in a poll by the Pew Research Center that abortion should be legal with 46% stating it should be illegal in all or most cases.

In a March 2020 poll by Selzer & Co, 48% of Iowans believe abortion should be legal in all or most cases while 45% believe it should be illegal in all or most cases.

In a September 2021 poll by Slezer & Co, 57% of Iowans believe abortion should be legal in all or most cases while 39% believe it should be illegal in all or most cases.

Abortion rights views and activities

Protests 
Women from the state participated in marches supporting abortion rights as part of a #StoptheBans movement in May 2019. One protest occurred at the Statehouse in Des Moines, Iowa on May 21, 2019.

Anti-abortion rights views and activities

Activities 

The Marriage Vow or "The Marriage Vow - A Declaration of Dependence Upon Marriage and Family" is a political pledge created by Bob Vander Plaats, a former candidate for Iowa governor, and the Iowa-based conservative group; The Family Leader, a public advocacy organization affiliated with the Iowa Family Policy Center, that he heads. The 2 most notable signatures came from Rick Santorum and Michele Bachmann. Rick Santorum was the first presidential candidate to contact The Family Leader after the organization publicly announced the pledge. Michele Bachmann also contacted The Family Leader to sign the pledge, and became the first Candidate to send her signed document to the organization. Although Newt Gingrich did not sign the pledge, he wrote a lengthy letter in which he upheld many of the principles of the pledge including personal fidelity to his wife, respecting the marital bonds of others, enforcing the defense of marriage act, to support a federal marriage amendment, and to oppose any definition of marriage outside of "one man and one woman." The pledge was also signed by former Texas governor Rick Perry.

Footnotes

References 

Iowa
Healthcare in Iowa
Women in Iowa